New York’s 25th congressional district is a congressional district for the United States House of Representatives. It is currently represented by Democrat Joseph Morelle. Since 2023, the district has been  located within Monroe County and part of Orleans County, centered on the city of Rochester.

In the 2018 race, the seat was vacant. State Assembly Member Joseph Morelle (Democrat) faced James Maxwell (Republican, Conservative, Reform), in the general election, which Morelle won handily. Morelle went on to win reelection in 2020 and 2022.

Voting

History

Historically, most of this district was located in Upstate New York. In the 1960s, the 25th District was a Westchester/Rockland seat, covering areas now in the 17th and 18th Districts. In the 1970s it was the lower Hudson Valley district and congruent to the present 19th District. Onondaga County was split between the 32nd District (which included rural counties east of Syracuse now in the 23rd and 24th Districts) and the 33rd District (which included the Finger Lakes counties in the 24th and 29th Districts).

In the 1980s, the district was centered in the Utica area (now the 24th District), and the Syracuse area was entirely in the 27th District. From 2003 to 2013, it stretched from Syracuse to the northeastern suburbs of Rochester.  The district comprised Onondaga and Wayne counties, the northernmost portion of Cayuga County, and the towns of Irondequoit, Penfield, and Webster in Monroe County.  The district included 100 miles of Lake Ontario shoreline, the easternmost Finger Lakes, and significant portions of the Erie Canal.

List of members representing the district

Election results 
In New York State electoral politics, the state allows Electoral fusion, with numerous minor parties at various points on the political spectrum that typically endorse either the Republican or Democratic candidate for an office. Hence the state electoral results contain both the party votes, and the final candidate votes (Listed as "Recap").

Historical district boundaries

See also

List of United States congressional districts
New York's congressional districts
United States congressional delegations from New York

References 

 Congressional Biographical Directory of the United States 1774–present
 2004 House election data Clerk of the House of Representatives
 2002 House election data "
 2000 House election data "
 1998 House election data "
 1996 House election data "

25
Constituencies established in 1823
1823 establishments in New York (state)